Monte San Giovanni in Sabina is a  (municipality) in the Province of Rieti in the Italian region of Latium, located about  northeast of Rome and about  southwest of Rieti.

It is located on a ridge of the Monti Sabini. The town grew around a walled castle, which was first mentioned in 1240.

References

Cities and towns in Lazio